Khandabad is a village in the Bhopal district of Madhya Pradesh, India. It is located in the Huzur tehsil and the Phanda block. The Tapti Vihar Phase II township is being developed here.

Demographics 

According to the 2011 census of India, Khandabad has 32 households. The effective literacy rate (i.e. the literacy rate of population excluding children aged 6 and below) is 82.93%.

References 

Villages in Huzur tehsil